Harold Elliott Makeham (22 December 1882 – 8 February 1956) was an English film and television actor.

Career
Makeham was born in London, England. Between 1931 and 1956, Makeham appeared, primarily in character roles, in 115 films and in 11 television productions. He played a small number of leading roles in the 1930s, but was more regularly seen in cameos as harassed officials or henpecked husbands.

Personal life
Married three times, Makeham's third wife was British character actress, Betty Shale.

Selected filmography

 Rome Express (1932) - Mills
 I'm an Explosive (1933) - Prof. Whimperly
 Forging Ahead (1933) - Abraham Lombard
 The Lost Chord (1933) - Bertie Pollard
 I Lived with You (1933) - Mr. Wallis
 I Was a Spy (1933) - Pharmacist (uncredited)
 Friday the Thirteenth (1933) - Henry Jackson
 The Roof (1933) - John Rutherford
 The Laughter of Fools (1933) - John Gregg
 Home, Sweet Home (1933) - James Merrick
 The Crimson Candle (1934) - Dr. Gaunt
 Princess Charming (1934) - The Real Walter Chuff (uncredited)
 Orders Is Orders (1934) - Pvt. Slee
 Bypass to Happiness (1934) - Miller
 Unfinished Symphony (1934) - Joseph Passenter
 Falling in Love (1934) - Caretaker (uncredited)
 Lorna Doone (1934) - John Fry
 Peg of Old Drury (1935) - Dr. Bowdler (uncredited)
 Her Last Affaire (1935) - Dr. Rudd (uncredited)
 Mr. Cohen Takes a Walk (1935) - Storekeeper (uncredited)
 Two Hearts in Harmony (1935) - Wagstaff
 Once in a New Moon (1935) - Harold Drake
 The Last Journey (1936) - Pip
 Someone at the Door (1936) - (uncredited)
 A Star Fell from Heaven (1936) - Music Professor
 To Catch a Thief (1936) - Secretary
 Calling the Tune (1936) - Stephen Harbord
 The Brown Wallet (1936) - Hobday
 Born That Way (1936) - Prof. Gearing
 East Meets West (1936) - Goodson 
 Tomorrow We Live (1936) - Henry Blossom
 The Mill on the Floss (1936) - Mr. Pullet (uncredited)
 Head Over Heels (1937) - Martin
 Dark Journey (1937) - Anatole Bergen
 Take My Tip (1937) - Digworthy
 Farewell Again (1937) - Maj. Swayle
 Storm in a Teacup (1937) - Sheriff
 Racing Romance (1937) - George Hanway
 East of Ludgate Hill (1937)
 Merely Mr. Hawkins (1938) - Alfred Hawkins
 Darts Are Trumps (1938) - Joe Stone
 Coming of Age (1938) - Henry Strudwick
 Vessel of Wrath (1938) - The Native Head Clerk
 It's in the Air (1938) - Sir Philip's Gardener
 Weddings Are Wonderful (1938) - Minor role
 You're the Doctor (1938) - Prout
 The Citadel (1938) - Jack the Pharmacist (uncredited)
 Keep Smiling (1938) - Printer (uncredited)
 Everything Happens to Me (1938)
 Anything to Declare? (1938) - Prof. Grayson
 Bedtime Story (1938) - Uncle Toby
 Me and My Pal (1939) - Cripps
 The Nursemaid Who Disappeared (1939) - Mr. Hines
 Inspector Hornleigh (1939) - Alexander Parkinson, Leather Worker
 The Four Just Men (1939) - Simmonds
 Return to Yesterday (1940) - Fred Grover
 Spy for a Day (1940) - Mr. Trufit
 Pastor Hall (1940) - Pippermann
 A Window in London (1940) - Stage Doorman (uncredited)
 Just William (1940) - Man in sweet shop (uncredited)
 Busman's Honeymoon (1940) - Simpson
 Night Train to Munich (1940) - Schwab
 Saloon Bar (1940) - Meek Man
 Spare a Copper (1940) - Fuller
 Facing the Music (1941) - Secretary
 The Common Touch (1941) - 'Inky'
 Suspected Person (1942) - David
 They Flew Alone (1942) - Mayor of Croydon
 Let the People Sing (1942) - Town clerk
 Uncensored (1942) - Abbe De Moor
 Schweik's New Adventures (1943) - Prof. Jan Borski
 Yellow Canary (1943) - Observer Corpsman in Opening Scene (uncredited)
 Bell-Bottom George (1944) - Johnson
 The Hundred Pound Window (1944) - Bank Teller (uncredited)
 The Halfway House (1944) - The Dresser
 A Canterbury Tale (1944) - Organist
 Champagne Charlie (1944) - Vance's Songwriter (uncredited)
 Give Us the Moon (1944) - Dumka
 Don't Take It to Heart (1944) - Roberts (uncredited)
 Candles at Nine (1944) - Everard Hope
 Madonna of the Seven Moons (1945) - Bossi
 I'll Be Your Sweetheart (1945) - John Friar
 Perfect Strangers (1945) - Mr. Staines
 The Magic Bow (1946) - Giuseppe
 Code of Scotland Yard (1947) - Usher at Concert Hall (uncredited)
 The Life and Adventures of Nicholas Nickleby (1947) - Postman
 Frieda (1947) - Bailey
 Jassy (1947) - Moult - the Butler
 The Little Ballerina (1947) - Mr. Maggs
 Call of the Blood (1948) - Laboratory assistant (uncredited)
 So Evil My Love (1948) - Joe Helliwell
 Daybreak (1948) - Mr. Bigley
 Love in Waiting (1948) - Sam Baxter
 No Room at the Inn (1948) - News Editor
 Vote for Huggett (1949) - Mr. Christie
 Forbidden (1949) - Pop Thompson
 Murder at the Windmill (1949) - Gimpy
 Children of Chance (1949) - Vicar
 Night and the City (1950) - Pinkney (scenes deleted)
 Trio (1950) - Sexton (in segment The Verger)
 The Miniver Story (1950) - Mr. Farraday (uncredited)
 Dick Barton at Bay (1950) - Police Sergeant (uncredited)
 Scarlet Thread (1951) - Jason
 Scrooge (1951) - Mr. Snedrig
 Green Grow the Rushes (1951) - James Urquhart
 The Crimson Pirate (1952) - Governor
 Decameron Nights (1953) - Governor of Majorca
 The Yellow Balloon (1953) - Pawnbroker
 Always a Bride (1953) - Roger, Hotel Guest
 The Fake (1953) - George
 Meet Mr. Lucifer (1953) - Edwards
 Stryker of the Yard (1953) - Uncle Henry Petheridge
 The Million Pound Note (1954) - Consulate Official (uncredited)
 Fast and Loose (1954) - Railway porter (uncredited)
 The Weak and the Wicked (1954) - Grandad Baden
 Doctor in the House (1954) - Elderly Examiner
 The Rainbow Jacket (1954) - Valet
 Companions in Crime (1954) - Councillor Sandford
 Sailor Beware! (1956) - Uncle Brummell

Death
He died in London aged 73.

References

External links

 

1882 births
1956 deaths
English male film actors
English male television actors
Male actors from London
20th-century English male actors